Nukres (also Romanized as Nūkres; also known as Nūkrās) is a village in Kuhestan Rural District, Kelardasht District, Chalus County, Mazandaran Province, Iran. At the 2006 census, its population was 143, in 39 families.

References 

Populated places in Chalus County